Lake Hubert may refer to:

Lake Hubert, Minnesota, an unincorporated community
Lake Hubert (Minnesota), a lake in Minnesota